Soora is a 2008 Maldivian drama film written and directed by Fathimath Nahula. Produced under Crystal Entertainment, the film stars Ali Ahmed, Amira Ismail and Aminath Ameela in pivotal roles.

Premise
Riyaz and Niyaz (both roles played by Ali Ahmed) are two identical twins; Riyaz is happily married to Zeena (Aminath Ameela) while Niyaz is romantically attracted to Nashwa (Amira Ismail) who is being domestically abused by her drug addict husband, Shifan (Mahir). Niyaz was able to save Nashwa from her miserable life but the family met with an unfortunate incident when the cycle Niyaz and Riyaz were driving gets crashed in an accident ultimately killing the latter.

Cast 
 Ali Ahmed as Riyaz / Niyaz
 Amira Ismail as Nashwa
 Aminath Ameela as Zeena
 Arifa Ibrahim as Khadheeja
 Hamid Ali as Fuwad
 Aminath Shareef as Riyaz and Niyaz's mother
 Abdulla Mahir as Shifan
 Inayath as Aisha
 Yooshau Jameel as Huzam
 Haseena as Nashwa's mother
 Abdul Raheem
 Yoosuf Zuhuree
 Shiman

Soundtrack
The film has only one song, titled "Soora" and also known as "Vakive Dhiyayas". Two versions of the song were released; a solo version by Ibrahim Zaid Ali and a duet version along with Mariyam Unoosha. The original melody and track was believed to break the norm in Nahula's films; inclusion of Bollywood unofficial remake songs.

References

2008 films
Maldivian drama films
Films directed by Fathimath Nahula
2008 drama films
Dhivehi-language films